Tritia miga is a species of sea snail, a marine gastropod mollusc in the family Nassariidae, the nassa mud snails or dog whelks.

Description
The length of the shell varies between 13 mm and 20 mm.

The ovate, conical shell has an ash-gray color. It is ornamented with a reddish zone at the suture, and another, much wider and more deeply colored band, at the base of the body whorl. The spire is composed of seven rounded, swollen whorls, provided with ten or twelve distant and slightly oblique folds, marked also by a great number of transverse striae, which intersect the folds at right angles, and become more apparent near the base of the body whorl. The aperture is whitish or violet colored and nearly round. The outer lip is slightly margined, covered internally with transverse striae. The columella is arcuated, and twisted at its base. The inner lip, which partially covers it, is indistinctly striated, and forms a wrinkle at the upper part.

Distribution
This species occurs in the Atlantic Ocean off Senegal, Gambia and Mauritania.

References

 Cernohorsky W. O. (1984). Systematics of the family Nassariidae (Mollusca: Gastropoda). Bulletin of the Auckland Institute and Museum 14: 1–356.
 Wolff, W.J.; Duiven, P.; Esselink, P.; Gueve, A. (1993). Biomass of macrobenthic tidal flat fauna of the Banc d'Arguin, Mauritania. Hydrobiologia 258(1–3): 151–163

External links
 Galindo, L. A.; Puillandre, N.; Utge, J.; Lozouet, P.; Bouchet, P. (2016). The phylogeny and systematics of the Nassariidae revisited (Gastropoda, Buccinoidea). Molecular Phylogenetics and Evolution. 99: 337-353

Nassariidae
Gastropods described in 1789